Aldo Nadi (29 April 1899 – 10 November 1965) was one of the greatest Italian fencers of all time.

Biography

Aldo was born into a fencing family in Livorno, Italy, and both Aldo and his brother Nedo Nadi were fencers from a very young age. They were both taught foil and sabre in the classical Italian school of swordsmanship by their father, Beppe Nadi, who believed the épée to be an "undisciplined" weapon and refused to teach it. The brothers therefore practiced épée by themselves.

In 1920, at the age of 21, Nadi won gold medals at the Olympics in team foil, team épée, and team sabre. He also won a silver medal in individual sabre, second only to his brother Nedo Nadi.

Nadi emigrated to the United States in 1935. Also in 1943, he relocated to Los Angeles, California, where he continued to teach fencing in his own school, in addition to occasionally coaching actors for fencing scenes in films. He even made a film appearance himself, as a bodyguard in To Have and Have Not (1944), starring Humphrey Bogart.

In 1955, Nadi wrote his autobiography (The Living Sword: A Fencer's Autobiography), which was published 30 years after his death.

Nadi died in his sleep, at his home in Los Angeles, California, on 10 November 1965.

Nadi was known for his real-life duels. At the 1920 Olympics, he fought Italian weightlifter Filippo Bottino with a riding whip, while Bottino used a wooden beam. The duel ended very quickly as Nadi struck Bottino's hand, causing him to drop the weapon. Later Nadi fought and severely injured a journalist who had mocked him. He also challenged a fellow fencing champion Edoardo Mangiarotti because he felt that Mangiarotti was favored to him by the Italian Olympic Committee. Nadi proposed to use pistols, which Mangiarotti declined.

Filmography

Bibliography

References

External links 

 
 

Italian male épée fencers
1899 births
1965 deaths
Olympic fencers of Italy
Olympic gold medalists for Italy
Olympic silver medalists for Italy
Fencers at the 1920 Summer Olympics
Olympic medalists in fencing
Sportspeople from Livorno
Medalists at the 1920 Summer Olympics
Italian male foil fencers
Italian male sabre fencers